Bonanza Bunny is a 1959 Warner Bros. Merrie Melodies cartoon directed by Robert McKimson. The short was released on September 5, 1959, and stars Bugs Bunny. In the cartoon, Bugs faces off with the French-Canadian claim jumper Blacque Jacque Shellacque during a fictionalized version of the Klondike Gold Rush.

Plot
Set in 1896 in Dawson City, Yukon, Canada, Bugs Bunny walks into the saloon with a bag full of gold nuggets. Bugs has no use for these yellow rocks, admitting that he confused "karats" with the vegetable when he traveled to the area (having actually heard about the Klondike Gold Rush). The men in the saloon look suspiciously at Bugs, who requests a glass of carrot juice, to which an eager bartender give Bugs his best serving of carrot juice, complimenting the stone, to which Bugs pays him with it, apparently naive as to what they are. Abruptly, Bugs is almost shot at by a man who identifies himself as Blacque Jacque Shellacque—a criminal wanted for claim-jumping; pogo-sticking and square dance calling.

Jacque is oblivious to Bugs' naivety in regards to the gold and demands he hand it over. When Bugs refuses to cooperate, Jacque engages in a series of tricks to seize the gold. Bugs and Jacque play blackjack, during which Bugs stands on one card and to Jacque's shock the one card is the "21 of hearts". Bugs, seemingly unaware of the danger he is in, recovers his wagered bag of gold and calmly begins to leave, but is stopped by an enraged Jacque.

Right after Jacque openly states how dangerous he is, Bugs convinces Jacque that there is someone in another room who claims to be twice as dangerous. As Jacque goes in to confront this stranger, whom we see is Bugs in disguise, he sees Bugs pull out a pop gun. Just as Jacque pulls out the cork, the gun blasts him in the face. Bugs then pretends to have a phone call for Jacque from "Fifi from Montreal"—with the receiver being a lit stick of dynamite; Jacque takes the bait and the dynamite explodes. A dazed Jacque remarks on how his girlfriend "FiFi" was always a "blast."

In the final scene, Jacque corners Bugs in a back storeroom and in a form of armed robbery, holds a pistol to Bugs Bunny and demands the gold. Bugs then pretends to cower and "surrenders" the gold, actually handing him a bag filled with gunpowder that begins to leak, leaving a trail behind Jacque, who proceeds to run off into the mountains shouting "I'm rich, I'm rich! 90% bracket!" while Bugs lights the trail of gunpowder. This creates a large and colorful explosion off in the distance, to which Bugs remarks, "Gee, those Northern Lights are pretty this time of year."  Bugs reveals that the 'gold' was merely rocks painted yellow, and he departs on his huskie dog.

Production
This short marks the first appearance of Blacque Jacque Shellacque. Gags are reused from Bunker Hill Bunny (1950) and Bugs Bunny Rides Again (1948). Animation of the gamblers fleeing when Blacque Jacque Shellacque arrives at the saloon is re-used from Drip-Along Daffy (1951). This marks the final time a cartoon is narrated by actor Robert C. Bruce before his retirement.

See also
 List of American films of 1959

References

External links

 
 

1959 films
1959 animated films
1959 short films
Merrie Melodies short films
Warner Bros. Cartoons animated short films
Films directed by Robert McKimson
Films set in 1896
Films set in Yukon
Films scored by Milt Franklyn
Bugs Bunny films
1950s Warner Bros. animated short films
1950s English-language films